Batrachedra psithyra, the spleenwort spore-eater, is a species of moth of the family Batrachedridae. It is endemic to New Zealand. This species has been observed in the North, South and Matiu / Somes Islands. This species inhabits overgrown grasslands or fern glades and have also been observed in gumland heath. The larvae of this species feed on fern sori including those on Histiopteris incisa. Adults are on the wing from November to January and tends to fly at sunset. At rest this species raises the front part of its body and when moving waves alternate antennae.

Taxonomy 
Batrachedra psithyra was described in 1889 by Edward Meyrick using material he collected in Hamilton. George Hudson discussed and illustrated this species in his 1928 publication The Butterflies and Moths of New Zealand under the name Batrachedra psathyra. The lectotype specimen is held by the Natural History Museum, London.

Description 

The larva of this species is small and pale. When mature it is between 5 to 6 mm long with a head that is light brown. 

Meyrick described the species as follows: 
The small dark dot and line of scales right at the end tip of the wing is characteristic of this species.

Distribution 
This species is endemic to New Zealand. Specimens have been collected in Kaeo, Auckland, Hamilton, Wellington, Nelson, Christchurch, Queenstown and Invercargill. It has also been found in Fiordland, and on Somes Island.

Biology and behaviour 
The larvae of this species lives under its host fern fronds feeding on spores. It creates an "H" shaped silken cocoon and pupates within the cross bar that cocoon.  The adult moths of this species is on the wing from November to January. It flies freely at sunset. Hudson stated it was common in the upper parts of the Wellington Reservoir Reserve, an area now known as Zealandia. At rest, this species raises the forepart of its body and when about to move has a habit of waving alternate antennae.

Habitat and host species 
The species prefers rough overgrown habitat of grasslands or fern glades near forest. This species has also been found in gumland heath habitat. The larvae of this species feed on fern sori and hosts include species in the genus Asplenium as well  as the species Histiopteris incisa.

References

External links

Lectotype specimen held at the Natural History Museum, London.

Batrachedridae
Moths of New Zealand
Moths described in 1889
Endemic fauna of New Zealand
Taxa named by Edward Meyrick
Endemic moths of New Zealand